Edward Roger Ingram Ellis (born in Calcutta, India) was an Anglo-Canadian historian of the British Empire, long-time former editor of the International History Review, and emeritus professor at Simon Fraser University.  Having obtained his BA and MA degrees from Balliol College, Oxford, Ingram went on to receive his PhD in international history from the London School of Economics, completing his doctoral dissertation under the direction of Hilda Lee and Elie Kedourie. Most of Ingram's scholarly publishing focused on the so-called Great Game, the imperial rivalry between the British and Russian Empires in Central Asia. In 1966 he joined the faculty of Simon Fraser University in Burnaby, British Columbia, Canada. In 1978 he was made Professor of Imperial History at SFU and became editor of the International History Review, holding the former position until his retirement in 2003. He remained Professor of Imperial History Emeritus at SFU until his passing in 2022.

Ingram died in Carterton, New Zealand on March 15, 2022.

Selected bibliography

Two Views of British India: The Private Correspondence of Mr. Dundas and Lord Wellesley, 1798–1801 (Editor, 1970)
The Beginning of the Great Game in Asia, 1828–1834 (1979)
Commitment to Empire: Prophecies of the Great Game in Asia 1797–1800 (1981)
In Defence of British India: Great Britain in the Middle East, 1774–1842 (1984)
National and International Politics in the Middle East: Essays in Honour of Elie Kedourie (Editor, 1986)
Britain's Persian Connection, 1798–1828: Prelude to the Great Game in Asia (1992)
Eastern Questions in the Nineteenth Century: Collected Essays (Editor, 1993)
Anglo-Ottoman Encounters in the Age of Revolution (Editor, 1993)
Empire Building and Empire Builders (1995)
The British Empire as a World Power (2001)

See also
British Empire
British Raj
Company rule in India
Elie Kedourie
Great Game
Richard Wellesley, 1st Marquess Wellesley

References

Alumni of Balliol College, Oxford
Alumni of the London School of Economics
Academic staff of Simon Fraser University
20th-century English historians
20th-century Canadian historians
Canadian male non-fiction writers
1945 births
Living people